The 2006 Tour of California  was the inaugural edition of a professional road cycling stage race that made its debut on February 19, 2006. Sponsored by the biotechnology company Amgen, the eight-day, 700 mile (1,126 km) race started in San Francisco, winding its way down the California coast to finish in Redondo Beach. With eight of the twenty European UCI ProTour teams in attendance, the inaugural Tour of California proved to be one of the largest cycling races in the United States since the demise of the Coors Classic in 1988.

Among the professional cyclists in attendance were George Hincapie, Floyd Landis, Chris Horner and Freddy Rodriguez, Bobby Julich and Dave Zabriskie, Levi Leipheimer, and Gilberto Simoni.

Stages of the 2006 Tour of California

San Francisco individual time trial
Bay Area resident Levi Leipheimer took the early lead in the Tour and secured the leader's golden jersey by winning the prologue time trial. His time of 4:53.43 put him ahead of second-place finisher Bobby Julich, who finished five seconds behind the leader . Americans swept the first five spots with George Hincapie finishing third, followed by Floyd Landis and David Zabriskie. The 1.9 mile  (3.1 km) prologue began at San Francisco's Ferry Building and climbed up Telegraph Hill to finish at the base of Coit Tower.

Sausalito to Santa Rosa
This was the first win for team Toyota-United Pro.

 controlled the race, letting Jean Marc Marino and Jackson Stewart (Kodakgallery.Com-Sierra Nevada) escape, but keeping the time gap small enough to catch them before the finish.

Arriving in his hometown in the leader's golden jersey, Levi Leipheimer (Gerolsteiner) was greeted by tens of thousands of his fans.  By finishing near the front of the main pack, he retained the jersey for the next day.

Martinez to San José
Mike Creed (TIAA-CREF) sprinted away from the field just nine miles (14 km) after the start.  He was followed by Mads Kaggestad (Crédit Agricole) and Ben Jaques-Maynes (Kodak Gallery.com/Sierra Nevada).  The three remained in front for the next 40 miles (64 km) or so, until they were caught by the peloton.  Bernhard Kohl (T-Mobile) won the King of the Mountain for the day.

George Hincapie (Discovery Channel) won the stage and with the ten second time bonus took the lead from Levi Leipheimer (Gerolsteiner).  This put Leipheimer in second place, four seconds behind Hincapie.

San José individual time trial
Floyd Landis won the time trial and took over the lead in the overall with a time of 35:58 for the 17-mile course, 26 seconds faster than second-place finisher David Zabriskie, whose time for the third stage was 36:24.  Landis' outstanding performance allowed him to gain 55 seconds on George Hincapie and 1:16 over Levi Leipheimer, establishing overall gaps of 45 seconds and 1:10 respectively, which were never to change throughout the remainder of the tour.

Monterey to San Luis Obispo
The longest stage of the tour closed with a mass sprint in San Luis Obispo, with Juan José Haedo taking his second stage of the race. Floyd Landis maintained the overall lead.

San Luis Obispo to Santa Barbara
Another sprint to the finish line, and George Hincapie won his second ToC stage; however, the overall standings remained the same, with Floyd Landis holding on to the gold Leader's jersey. Hincapie did take the Sprinter's jersey while Levi Leipheimer, true to his strength, took the King of the Mountain jersey by collecting the first place points on the biggest climb of the stage, the category 1 climb of San Marcos Pass, 15 miles (24 km) from the finish. He was caught, however, on the downhill.

Santa Barbara to Thousand Oaks
This short stage was won following yet another sprint to the finish; this time, by Olaf Pollack of Team T-Mobile. Pollack finished in 3:26:39 to take his first stage win in a major race in about 18 months. Floyd Landis maintains a 29-second overall lead heading into the final stage, a 10-lap, 76.5-mile circuit race in Redondo Beach.

Redondo Beach circuit race
Olaf Pollack again won the stage and the green sprinter's jersey.  Floyd Landis' lead proved insurmountable, giving him the golden jersey signifying the overall win in the inaugural Amgen Tour of California by 29 seconds. The second- through seventh-place finishers (Zabriskie, Julich, Hincapie, O'Neill, Leipheimer and Evans) all were less than 1:30 off the lead. Leipheimer won the King of the Mountain (orange) jersey.  (sponsored by the Danish subsidiary of the California-based Computer Sciences Corporation) took Best Team honors.

Final standings top ten riders

Jersey progress
{| class="wikitable" style="text-align: center; font-size:smaller;"
|- style="background-color: #efefef;"
! width="14%" | Stage(Winner)
! style="background:#ffc80b;" width="14%"|General Classification
! style="background:#a4d049;" width="14%"|Sprint Classification
! style="background:#d56221;" width="14%"|Mountains Classification
! style="background:LightBlue;" width="14%"|Youth Classification
! style="background:;" width="14%"|Team Classification
! style="background:#cc0000;" width="14%"| Most Aggressive
|-
| Prologue(Levi Leipheimer)
| style="background:#ffc80b" rowspan="2"| Levi Leipheimer
| style="background:" rowspan="1"| no award
| style="background:#d56221;" rowspan="5"| Bernhard Kohl
| style="background:LightBlue;" rowspan="2"| Zachary Grabowski
| style="background: rowspan="8"| 
| style="background:" rowspan="1"| no award|-
| Stage 1(Juan José Haedo)
| style="background:#a4d049;" rowspan="1"| Juan José Haedo
| style="background:#cc0000;" rowspan="1"| Jackson Stewart
|-
| Stage 2(George Hincapie)
| style="background:#ffc80b" rowspan="1"| George Hincapie
| style="background:#a4d049;" rowspan="2"| George Hincapie
| style="background:LightBlue;" rowspan="6"| Tom Peterson
| style="background:#cc0000;" rowspan="1"| Michael Creed
|-
| Stage 3(Floyd Landis)
| style="background:#ffc80b" rowspan="5"| Floyd Landis
| style="background:" rowspan="1"| no award|-
| Stage 4(Juan José Haedo)
| style="background:#a4d049;" rowspan="1"| Juan José Haedo
| style="background:#cc0000;" rowspan="1"| Lars Bak
|-
| Stage 5(George Hincapie)
| style="background:#a4d049;" rowspan="2"| George Hincapie
| style="background:#d56221;;" rowspan="3"| Levi Leipheimer
| style="background:#cc0000;" rowspan="1"| Nick Reistad
|-
| Stage 6(Olaf Pollack)
| style="background:#cc0000;" rowspan="1"| Sebastian Lang
|-
| Stage 7(Olaf Pollack)
| style="background:#a4d049;" rowspan="1"| Olaf Pollack
| style="background:#cc0000;" rowspan="1"| Glen Chadwick
|-
| Final
| style="background:#ffc80b" rowspan="1"| Floyd Landis
| style="background:#a4d049" rowspan="1"| Olaf Pollack
| style="background:#d56221" rowspan="1"| Levi Leipheimer
| style="background:LightBlue;" rowspan="1"| Tom Peterson
| style="background:" rowspan="1"| 
|}

Teams

Health Net Pro Cycling Team Presented by Maxxis
Navigators Insurance Pro Cycling Team
Jelly Belly Pro Cycling Team
Team TIAA-CREF
 Colavita Olive Oil / Sutter Home Winery Cycling Team
KodakGallery.com / Sierra Nevada Pro Cycling Team
KB Home Mexico National Team
Toyota-United Pro Cycling Team

External links
  - 2006 Tour Archive
 Live Coverage and Photos Cyclingfans.com Amgen Tour of California: No more dreamin' VeloNews.com''

2006
Tour of California 2006
Tour of California 2006
Tour of California